KJTV-CD, virtual channel 32 (UHF digital channel 33), is a low-power, Class A news-formatted independent television station serving Lubbock, Texas, United States, that is licensed to Wolfforth. Owned by Augusta, Georgia–based SagamoreHill Broadcasting, it is sister to Lubbock-licensed Fox affiliate KJTV-TV (channel 34). The two stations are operated under a shared services agreement (SSA) by Gray Television, making them sisters to Gray's duopoly of Lubbock-licensed NBC affiliate KCBD (channel 11) and Wolfforth-licensed CW+ affiliate KLCW-TV (channel 22), as well as four other low-power stations—MyNetworkTV affiliate KMYL-LD (channel 14), Snyder-licensed Heroes & Icons affiliate KABI-LD (channel 42), Class A Telemundo affiliate KXTQ-CD (channel 46), and MeTV affiliate KLBB-LD (channel 48). The stations share studios at 98th Street and University Avenue in south Lubbock, where KJTV-CD's transmitter is also located.

History
The station was founded in 2001 as an AccuWeather Channel affiliate. It is unique because it is broadcast on two channels in the Lubbock area, channel 32.1 in HD and is rebroadcast in SD on channel 34.2 of KJTV-TV. It is carried on many area satellite and cable systems such as Suddenlink (Channel 9 SD, 109 HD), AT&T U-verse (channel 32 in SD and HD), NTS' FTTH system in (channel 5) and Dish Network. Local original programming on the station totals 65 hours per week. Original programming includes a prime time newscast at 6, 7 and 8 p.m. each night, 44 hours per week of sports talk originating from the studios co-owned Double T 97.3 KTTU-FM, local high school football, basketball, baseball and softball, and Lubbock Christian University basketball. Additional news programming includes West Texas Ag life from 1-2:30, repeats of FOX 34's Good Day Lubbock and FOX 34's News at 9:00 repeats at 10 and 11 pm.

On January 7, 2011, the station's digital channel was licensed under the call sign KJTV-LD. On October 21, 2011, the digital channel changed its call sign to KJTV-CD to reflect its class A status.

The station's analog license was cancelled and the KJTV-CA call sign deleted by the Federal Communications Commission on December 13, 2011. On December 31, 2013, KJTV-CD added WeatherNation TV to the station's second digital subchannel. The channel is known as FOX 34 WeatherNation.

Technical information

Subchannels
The station's digital channel is multiplexed:

References

External links

SagamoreHill Broadcasting
Gray Television
JTV-CD
WeatherNation TV affiliates
Dabl affiliates
Television channels and stations established in 2005
Low-power television stations in the United States